The 1976 Bath City Council election was held on Thursday 6 May 1976 to elect councillors to Bath City Council in England. It took place on the same day as other district council elections in the United Kingdom. The entire council was up for election. Following boundary changes the number of wards was increased by one, and the number of seats increased from 45 to 48. This was the second election to the district council, the election saw terms of councillors extended from three to four years. Subsequent elections for the council would be elected by thirds following the passing a resolution under section 7 (4) (b) of the Local Government Act 1972.

The 1976 election saw the Conservatives take majority control of the City Council.

Election results

Ward results
Sitting councillors seeking re-election, elected in 1973, are marked with an asterisk (*). The ward results listed below are based on the changes from the 1973 elections where boundary changes have not taken place, not taking into account any party defections or by-elections.

Abbey

Bathwick

Bloomfield

Combe Down

Kingsmead

Lambridge

Lansdown

Lyncombe

Newbridge

Oldfield

Southdown

Twerton

Walcot

Westmoreland

Weston

Widcombe

References

Bath
1976